Q66 may refer to:
 Q66 (New York City bus)
 At-Tahrim, a surah of the Quran